The Party of Young Free Democrats of Romania (PTLDR) was a political party in Romania.

History
The PTLDR contested the 1990 general elections, receiving around 0.3% of the vote in the Chamber of Deputies election and 0.2% in the Senate elections. Although it failed to win a seat in the Senate, the party won one seat in the Chamber.

In January 1992, the party merged into the Republican Party.

Electoral history

Legislative elections

References

Defunct political parties in Romania